Fred de Jong (born 5 April 1964) is a New Zealand former football striker who represented his country in the 1980s and early 1990s.

Club career
De Jong played senior football with Mt. Wellington before moving to Australia, helping Marconi Stallions to consecutive National Soccer League titles in 1988 and 1989. De Jong then took advantage of his heritage, joining Fortuna Sittard in the Dutch Eredivisie (First Division) in 1990, playing against the likes of Romario and Dennis Bergkamp. De Jong played three seasons in the Dutch top flight (53 games; 6 goals) and one more in the Eerste Divisie (Second Division). He returned to New Zealand after the Dutch 1993–94 season to play domestically for Central United and later played in the Australian National Soccer League for the Football Kingz 1999–2000.

International career
De Jong marked his All Whites debut with a substitute appearance in a 6–1 win over Malaysia on 3 April 1984 and ended his international playing career with 21 A-international caps and 3 goals to his credit, his final cap coming in a 0–1 loss to Australia on 30 May 1993.

Post playing career
De Jong retains involvement in football serving as a director on the New Zealand Football board and as vice president of the Oceania Football Confederation.

He is an occasional TV commentator for SKY TV in New Zealand and has been a contributor of football related articles for the New Zealand Herald.

Personal life 
De Jong's son Andre played for the New Zealand national under-17 football team, the 2013 FIFA U-17 World Cup in the United Arab Emirates. Andre played on the team, along with Alex Rufer, son of Shane Rufer and Matt Ridenton, son of former New Zealand All White's player Michael Ridenton.

References 

He is now involved at Ellerslie AFC,where he coaches the 13th grade metro team which his son plays for

External links
 Fred de Jong Interview
 De Jong in twilight of top career

1964 births
Living people
Sportspeople from Hamilton, New Zealand
New Zealand people of Dutch descent
New Zealand association footballers
New Zealand international footballers
National Soccer League (Australia) players
Football Kingz F.C. players
Fortuna Sittard players
Marconi Stallions FC players
Central United F.C. players
Association football forwards